Naga Pooja is a 1965 Indian Kannada-language film, directed by D. S. Rajagopal and produced by A. S. Bhakthavathsalam and N. Geethadevi. The film stars Rajkumar, Leelavathi, Raghavendra Rao, Rajendra Krishna and Hanumantha Rao. The film has musical score by T. G. Lingappa.

Cast

Rajkumar
Raghavendra Rao
Rajendra Krishna
Hanumantha Rao
Comedian Guggu
Leelavathi
Rajasree
Papamma
Geethadevi
Shantha
Shivaji Rao
Thipatur Raghu
Naresh
Siddalingappa
Balu
Madan
Bharathi
Rama
Revathi
Lakshmi Rajyam

Soundtrack
The music was composed by T. G. Lingappa and lyrics by Geetha Priya.

References

External links
 

1965 films
1960s Kannada-language films
Films scored by T. G. Lingappa